Thomas Donkor Ogajah is a Ghanaian politician and was a member of the Seventh Parliament of the Fourth Republic of Ghana representing the Wulensi Constituency in the Northern Region on the ticket of the New Patriotic Party.

References

Ghanaian MPs 2017–2021
1968 births
Living people
New Patriotic Party politicians